Miss S (Hangul: 미스에스; stylized as Miss $) is a South Korean Hip hop duo formed by Brand New Stardom (formerly a joint venture between Stardom Entertainment and Brand New Music). They debuted on November 18, 2008 with the single "Don't Cheat".

Members

Current
 Jace (Hangul: 제이스)
 Kang Min-hee (강민희)

Former
 Oh Yu-mi (오유미)
 Tae Hye-young (태혜영)

Discography

Studio albums

Extended plays

Single albums

Singles

References

External links
 

K-pop music groups
South Korean girl groups
South Korean musical duos
Brand New Music artists
Musical groups from Seoul
Musical groups established in 2008
2008 establishments in South Korea